Xhuxhë is a populated place in Lezhë County, Albania. At the 2015 local government reform it became part of the municipality Mirditë.

See also
Fan, Albania

References

Populated places in Mirditë
Villages in Lezhë County